Kenneth W. Sumsion is a Republican member of the Utah House of Representatives who represents District 56 in American Fork, the state's largest legislative district with a population of more than 90,000.  He was one of the sponsors of a 2009 bill in the Utah legislature to ban most abortion cases. Sumsion was a candidate in the Utah gubernatorial election, 2012, challenging incumbent Republican Gary Herbert.

Sumsion is a graduate of Brigham Young University and a Certified Public Accountant.  He has been a state legislator since 2007.  He resides in American Fork, Utah.

Notes

Sources
Deseret News, Sep. 19, 2009
Medical News article on progress of the abortion ban bill in Utah

Brigham Young University alumni
Living people
Republican Party members of the Utah House of Representatives
People from American Fork, Utah
21st-century American politicians
Year of birth missing (living people)